Michael Komor (born 1960) has been Archdeacon of Margam since 2018.

Komor was educated at the University of Wales and Chichester Theological College. He was ordained deacon in 1986, and priest in 1987. After curacies in Mountain Ash and Llantwit Major he held incumbencies at Ewenny and Coity. He is also a member of the Chapter of Llandaff Cathedral. He was collated to the archdeaconry on 27 September 2018.

References

1960 births
Living people
Alumni of the University of Wales
21st-century Welsh Anglican priests
20th-century Welsh Anglican priests
Alumni of Chichester Theological College
Archdeacons of Margam